María Montecristo is a 1951 Mexican drama film directed by Luis César Amadori and starring Zully Moreno, Arturo de Córdova and Carlos López Moctezuma.

The film's art direction was by Jorge Fernández.

Main cast
 Zully Moreno as María Montecristo  
 Arturo de Córdova as Hugo Galarza  
 Carlos López Moctezuma as Avila  
 Andrés Soler as Doctor Segura  
 Jorge Reyes as Miguelito  
 Dolores Tinoco as Renee  
 Felipe Montoya as Señor cura  
 Eduardo Arozamena as Professor Fabré  
 Manuel Dondé as Lic. Suárez 
 Pepe Martínez as Toño  
 Antonio R. Frausto as Tomás  
 José Muñoz as Boticario  
 Maria Luisa Malvido
 Jorge Arriaga 
 Juan Orraca 
 Víctor Alcocer as Doctor  
 Manuel Noriega

References

Bibliography 
 Goble, Alan. The Complete Index to Literary Sources in Film. Walter de Gruyter, 1999.

External links 
 

1951 films
1951 drama films
Mexican drama films
1950s Spanish-language films
Films directed by Luis César Amadori
Mexican black-and-white films
1950s Mexican films